Alexandre Gillet is a French actor who is specialized particularly in the dubbing industry. He is the official French dub-over artist for actors, Elijah Wood, Joshua Jackson, Ryan Gosling, Ben Foster and David Charvet.

Dubbing roles
Major roles are Bold.

Live action films
Elijah Wood
The Lord of the Rings: The Fellowship of the Ring – Frodo Baggins (2001)
The Lord of the Rings: The Two Towers – Frodo Baggins (2002)
Try Seventeen – Jones (2002)
The Lord of the Rings: The Return of the King – Frodo Baggins (2003)
Spy Kids 3D: Game Over – The Guy (2003)
Everything Is Illuminated – Jonathan Safran Foer (2004)
Hooligans – Matt Buckner (2006)
Bobby – William Avary (2006) (France release: 2007)
The Oxford Murders – Martin (2008)
The Romantics – Chip Hayes (2010)
The Hobbit: An Unexpected Journey – Frodo Baggins (2012)
Maniac – Frank Zito (2012)
Joshua Jackson
Urban Legend – Damon Brooks (1999)
Cruel Intentions – Blaine Tuttle (1999)
Muppets From Space – Pacey Witter (1999)
The Skulls – Luke McNamara (2000)
The Safety of Objects – Paul Gold (2001)
Cowboys and Idiots – Earl Crest (2002)
Ryan Gosling
The Notebook – Noah Calhoun (2004)
Fracture – William Beachum (2007)
Blue Valentine – Dean Periera (2010)
Crazy, Stupid, Love – Jacob Palmer (2011)
The Ides of March – Stephen Meyers (2011)
Gangster Squad – Sergent Jerry Wooters (2013)
Ben Foster
Get Over It – Berke Landers (2001)
The Punisher – Dave (2004)
X-Men: The Last Stand – Warren Worthington III/Angel (2006)
The Mechanic – Steve McKenna (2011)
Contraband – Sebastian Abney (2012)

Live action television films
David Charvet
Derby – Cass Sundstrom (1995)
Seduced and Betrayed – Dan Hiller (1996)
Angel Flight Down – Brad Brown (1997)
Meet Prince Charming – Jack Harris (1999)
The Perfect Teacher – Jim Wilkes (2010)

 Aaron Paul
 Breaking Bad – Jesse Pinkman (2008–2013)
 El Camino: A Breaking Bad Movie – Jesse Pinkman (2019)
 Better Call Saul – Jesse Pinkman (2022)

Television Animation
Skylanders Academy - Spyro the Dragon
The Super Hero Squad Show - Iron Man
Ben 10 Omniverse - Rook Blonko
Sonic Boom - Sonic the Hedgehog

Anime
Sonic X - Sonic the Hedgehog

Video game roles
The Lord of the Rings: The Two Towers – Frodo Baggins (2002)
The Lord of the Rings: The Battle for Middle-earth – Frodo Baggins (2003)
The Lord of the Rings: The Return of the King – Frodo Baggins (2003)
ObsCure – Josh Carter (2004)
Jak 3 – Seem (2004)
Spyro the Dragon
The Legend of Spyro: A New Beginning (2006)
The Legend of Spyro: The Eternal Night (2007)
The Legend of Spyro: Dawn of the Dragon (2008)
Gears of War 2 – Benjamin Carmine (2008)
Dragon Age: Origins – Daveth (2009)
Mass Effect 2 – Veetor (2010)
Fallout: New Vegas – Yes-man (2010)
Sonic Generations – Sonic the Hedgehog (2011)
Gears of War 3 – Anthony Carmine, Benjamin Carmine and Clayton Carmine (2011)
Resident Evil: Revelations – Raymond Vester (2012)
Guild Wars 2 – Various Characters (2012)
World of Warcraft: Mists of Pandaria – Various Characters (2012)
Sonic Lost World - Sonic the Hedgehog (2013)
Mario & Sonic at the Sochi 2014 Olympic Winter Games - Sonic the Hedgehog (2013)

References

External links

Living people
French male actors
French male video game actors
French male voice actors
Year of birth missing (living people)